"Burn Out", a song by Sipho Mabuse, became one of the first major crossover hits in South Africa during the early 1980s, selling more than 500,000 copies.

Over the years the song has been remixed and covered by other artists, such as Timothy Moloi on the album Love That Music.

References

External links
"Burn Out" on YouTube

1984 singles
1984 songs